This is a chronological list of ships launched or scheduled to be launched in 2020.


References

2020
Ship launches
 
Ship launches